Mimopogonius is a genus of longhorn beetles of the subfamily Lamiinae, containing the following species:

 Mimopogonius hirsutus Breuning, 1974
 Mimopogonius hovorei Martins & Galileo, 2009

References

Desmiphorini